Mordini is a surname of Italian origin. Notable people with the surname include:

 Antonio Mordini (1819–1902), Italian political figure
 Davide Mordini (born 1996), Italian football player
 Domenico Mordini (1898–1948), Italian sailor

See also
 Mordini (disambiguation)

Surnames of Italian origin